Dayton Dynamo were a soccer organization based in Dayton, Ohio. After taking off the 2018 season in the hopes of returning in 2019 in a more Professional league, those ambitions never came into place and around midway through 2019, the team ceased operations. They last played in the National Premier Soccer League in the fourth tier of American soccer.

History
Established in 2009 as the Cincinnati Saints, the team had been a member of the affiliated amateur Premier Arena Soccer League since 2009 before moving up to the pro league in 2013; however, in 2014 the team returned to the amateur league.

Starting in May 2014, the Saints organization played outdoor soccer as an expansion team in the Great Lakes Conference of the National Premier Soccer League.

In November 2015, the Saints announced their intentions to move the club to Dayton, Ohio, and officially became the Dayton Dynamo, naming the team after the old indoor soccer team.

Indoor seasons 
The Saints played in the amateur Premier Arena Soccer League for 4 seasons, from 2009c10 until 2012–13.

In the 2013–14 season, the club moved to the Professional Arena Soccer League and played in the Eastern Division (the league is now known as Major Arena Soccer League-MASL). The team finished the professional season under the leadership of head coach Chris Morman with assistant coach Kyle Kammer. The Saints home arena is the Western Sports Mall in Cincinnati, Ohio. In 2014, Cincinnati moved back to the amateur league.

2013–14 season 

The Cincinnati Saints began their PASL run with a win over the Cleveland Freeze but lost six of their next eight matches. With 7 games remaining in the regular season, only the Illinois Piasa carried a worse record in the Eastern Division and the team parted ways with original head coach Matt Brienes on January 8, naming former player Chris Morman as his interim replacement. The Saints also participated in the 2013–14 United States Open Cup for Arena Soccer starting with a bye in the Round of 32 and a 10–6 loss to the Cleveland Freeze in the Round of 16, ending their tournament run. The Cincinnati Saints participated in the 2013–14 United States Open Cup for Arena Soccer starting with a bye in the Round of 32 and a 10–6 loss to the Cleveland Freeze in the Round of 16, ending their tournament run.

2014–15 season 
Following the de facto merger of the Professional Arena Soccer League with 6 teams from Major Indoor Soccer League and the rebranding of the league to Major Arena Soccer League, Cincinnati moved back to the Premier Arena Soccer League. The club finished 3rd in the Midwest Division with a 7–3 record.

The Dynamo Era (2016–present) 
In December 2015, it was announced that the Cincinnati Saints were relocating to Dayton, Ohio. Their first season in Dayton wasn't too successful, with only one win in the regular season. In their second season they finished second in their division, high enough to qualify for the playoffs.

Players and staff

Current roster

Year-by-year 

 * The MASL was called the Professional Arena Soccer League until 2014. To make it easier, the abbreviation MASL is used for the professional league and PASL is used for the amateur Premier Arena Soccer League.

Year-by-year

References

External links
 

 
2009 establishments in Ohio
Association football clubs established in 2009
National Premier Soccer League teams
Professional Arena Soccer League teams
Soccer clubs in Cincinnati
Indoor soccer clubs in the United States
Soccer in Dayton, Ohio